An off-road vehicle, sometimes referred to as an overland or adventure vehicle, is considered to be any type of vehicle which is capable of driving on and off paved or gravel surface. It is generally characterized by having large tyres with deep, open treads, a flexible suspension, or even caterpillar tracks. Other vehicles that do not travel on public streets or highways are generally termed off-highway vehicles, including tractors, forklifts, cranes, backhoes, bulldozers, and golf carts.

Off-road vehicles have an enthusiastic following because of their versatility. Several types of motorsports involve racing off-road vehicles. The most common use of these vehicles is for sight-seeing in areas distant from the pavement. The use of higher clearance and higher traction vehicles enables access on trails and forest roads that have rough and low traction surfaces. Off-road vehicles can typically ford through deeper waters (i.e., rivers or floodwaters) than on-road vehicles can.

History

One of the first modified off-road vehicles was the Kégresse track, a conversion undertaken first by Adolphe Kégresse, who designed the original while working for Czar Nicholas II of Russia between 1906 and 1916. The system uses a caterpillar track with a flexible belt rather than interlocking metal segments. It can be fitted to a conventional car or truck to turn it into a half-track suitable for use over rough or soft ground.

After the Russian Revolution of 1917, Kégresse returned to his native France where the system was used on Citroën cars between 1921 and 1937 for off-road and military vehicles. The Citroën company sponsored several overland expeditions with their vehicles crossing North Africa and Central Asia.

A huge wheeled vehicle designed from 1937 to 1939 under the direction of Thomas Poulter called Antarctic Snow Cruiser was intended to facilitate transport in the Antarctica. While having several innovative features, it generally failed to operate as hoped under the difficult conditions, and was eventually abandoned in Antarctica.

After World War II, a huge surplus of light off-road vehicles like the Jeep and heavier lorries were available on the automobile market. The Jeeps in particular were popular with buyers who used them as utility vehicles. This was also the start of off-roading as a hobby. The wartime Jeeps soon wore out, though, and the Jeep company started to produce civilian derivatives, closely followed by similar vehicles from British Land Rover and Japanese Toyota, Datsun/Nissan, Suzuki, and Mitsubishi. These were all alike: small, compact, four-wheel-drive vehicles with at most a small hardtop to protect the occupants from the elements.

From the 1960s and onward, more comfortable vehicles were produced. For several years, they were popular with rural buyers due to their off-road and load-lugging capabilities. The U.S. Jeep Wagoneer and the Ford Bronco, the British Range Rover, and the station wagon-bodied Japanese Toyota Land Cruiser, Nissan Patrol, and Suzuki Lj's series were all essentially just station wagon bodies on light truck frames with four-wheel-drive drivetrains. Later, during the 1990s, manufacturers started to add even more luxuries to bring those off-road vehicles on par with regular cars. This eventually evolved into what we call the SUV today. It also evolved into the newer crossover vehicle, where utility and off-road capability was sacrificed for better on-road handling and luxury.

Technical

To be able to drive off the pavement, off-road vehicles need several characteristics: They need to have a low ground pressure, so as not to sink into soft ground, they need ground clearance to not get hung up on obstacles, and they need to keep their wheels or tracks on the ground so as not to lose traction. Wheeled vehicles accomplish this by having a suitable balance of large or additional tires combined with tall and flexible suspension. Tracked vehicles accomplish this by having wide tracks and a flexible suspension on the road wheels.

The choice of wheels versus tracks is one of cost and suitability. A tracked drivetrain is more expensive to produce and maintain. Wheeled drivetrains are cheaper and give a higher top speed. The tracked drivetrain has greater off-road capability.

Tires play a significant role for any off-road vehicle equipped with wheels, as they ensure optimal traction required to keep it moving. The off-road tire tread types vary depending on the terrain type. The most common types of off-road tires are A/T (stands for "All Terrain") and M/T (stands for "Mud Terrain"). While the A/T tires perform excellently on the sand, they are barely usable in the mud. There are also unique Sand Blaster and Mud bogging tires used for the most challenging terrains such as dirt, sand, and even water to maintain traction at extreme angles and high speeds (off-road motorsport).

Most off-road vehicles are fitted with especially low gearing. This allows the operator to make the most of the engine's available power while moving slowly through challenging terrain. An internal combustion engine coupled to a standard gearbox often has an output speed too high. The vehicle often has one of two things, either a very low ("granny") first gear (like the all-wheel drive Volkswagen Transporter versions) or an additional gearbox in line with the first, called a reduction drive. Some vehicles, like the Bv206 in the picture on the right, also have torque converters to further reduce the gearing.

Many wheeled off-road vehicles provide power to all wheels to keep traction on slippery surfaces. For a typical four-wheel vehicle, this is known as four-wheel drive. Vehicles designed for use both on and off-road may be designed to be switched between two-wheel drive and four-wheel drive so that the vehicle uses fewer driven wheels when driven on the road.

Criticism of off-road vehicles

Safety

SUVs are built with higher ground clearance for off-road use and thus have a higher centre of gravity, therefore increasing the risk of rollover. When an SUV turns, the vehicle's mass resists the turn and carries the weight forward, thus allowing the traction from the tires to create a lateral centripetal force as the vehicle continues through the turn. The conflict between the top weight of the SUV's desire to go straight while the friction of the tires on the road causes the bottom of the vehicle to move away and out from under the vehicle during a turn.

SUVs are more likely to be in rollover accidents than passenger cars. According to a study conducted in the United States, SUVs have twice the fatality rate of cars and have nearly triple the fatality rate in rollover accidents.
Of vehicles in the United States, light trucks (including SUVs) represent 36 percent of all registered vehicles.  They are involved in about half of the fatal two-vehicle crashes with passenger cars, and 80 percent of these fatalities are to occupants of passenger cars.

Environment
In the United States, the number of ORV users since 1972 has climbed sevenfold—from five million to 36 million in 2000. Government policies that protect wilderness but also allow recreational ORV use have been the subject of some debate within the United States and other countries.

All trail and off-trail activities impact natural vegetation and wildlife, which can lead to erosion, invasive species, habitat loss, and ultimately species loss decreasing an ecosystem's ability to maintain homeostasis. ORVs cause greater stress to the environment than foot traffic alone, and ORV operators who attempt to test their vehicles against natural obstacles can do significantly more damage than those who follow legal trails. Illegal use of off-road vehicles has been identified as a serious land management problem ranked with dumping garbage and other forms of vandalism. Many user organizations, such as Tread Lightly! and the Sierra Club, publish and encourage appropriate trail ethics.

ORVs have also been criticized for producing more pollution in areas that might normally have none. In addition to noise pollution that can cause hearing impairment and stress in wildlife, according to the U.S. Forest Service, old-style two-stroke engines (no longer a component of new off-road vehicles, although some are still in use) "emit about 20 to 33 percent of the consumed fuel through the exhaust" and "discharge from two-stroke snowmobile engines can lead to indirect pollutant deposition into the top layer of snow and subsequently into the associated surface and groundwater." In 2002, the United States Environmental Protection Agency adopted emissions standards for all-terrain vehicles that "when fully implemented in 2012... are expected to prevent the release of more than two million tons of air pollution each year—the equivalent of removing the pollution from more than 32 million cars every year."

Common off-road vehicles
Common commercial off-road vehicles include four-wheel-drive pickup trucks like the Ford F-Series, Chevrolet C/K, Dodge Ram, and Toyota Tacoma. A number of military vehicles have also seen civilian use, including the Jeep CJ and the AM General Hummer. Some, like the early Land Rovers, were adapted to military use from civilian specifications. Specialized commonly available off-road vehicles include Utility terrain vehicles (UTVs), All-terrain vehicles (ATVs), dirt bikes, dune buggies, rock crawlers, and sandrails.

All-terrain vehicle

Off-road motorcycle 

There are various types of off-road motorcycles, also known as dirt bikes, specially designed for off-road events. Compared to road-going motorcycles, off-road machines are simpler and lighter, having long suspension travel, high ground clearance, and rugged construction with little bodywork and no fairings for less damage in spills.  Wheels (usually 21" front, 18" rear) have knobby tires, often clamped to the rim with a rim lock.

Commercial, military, and less common off-road vehicles
European militaries and utilities have used Land Rover Defenders, Haflingers, Pinzgauers, Volvo L3314, and Mercedes-Benz Unimogs for all-terrain transportation. The Portuguese UMM Alter is less common.

The military market for off-road vehicles used to be large, but, since the fall of the Iron Curtain in the 1990s, it has dried up to some extent. The U.S. jeeps, developed during World War II, coined the word many people use for any type of light off-road vehicle. In the U.S., the Jeeps' successor from the mid 1980s was the AM General HMMWV series. The Red Army used the GAZ-61 and GAZ-64 during World War II. The Eastern Bloc used the GAZ-69 and UAZ-469 in similar roles.

See also
 Amphibious vehicle
 Off roading
 Tread Lightly!
 Ramp travel index
 Sport utility vehicle
 Pickup truck
 Game viewer vehicle
 Overlanding

References

Notes

Bibliography

External links